Kostelec means 'fortified church' in Czech and may refer to several places in the Czech Republic:

Kostelec (Jičín District), a municipality and village in the Hradec Králové Region
Kostelec (Jihlava District), a municipality and village in the Vysočina Region
Kostelec (Hodonín District), a municipality and village in the South Moravian Region
Kostelec (Tachov District), a municipality and village in the Plzeň Region
Kostelec na Hané, a town in the Olomouc Region
Kostelec nad Černými lesy, a town in the Central Bohemian Region
Kostelec nad Labem, a town in the Central Bohemian Region
Kostelec nad Orlicí, a town in the Hradec Králové Region
Kostelec nad Vltavou, a municipality and village in the South Bohemian Region
Kostelec u Heřmanova Městce, a municipality and village in the Pardubice Region
Kostelec u Holešova, a municipality and village in the Zlín Region
Kostelec u Křížků, a municipality and village in the Central Bohemian Region
Červený Kostelec, a town in the Hradec Králové Region
Vrbatův Kostelec, a municipality and village in the Pardubice Region

Fictional 
Kostelec, a fictional town in northeast Bohemia, the setting for Josef Škvorecký's novel The Cowards and episodes of The Engineer of Human Souls, and based on Náchod.